Sinonovacula constricta, the constricted tagelus, Chinese razor clam or Agemaki clam, is a commercially important species of bivalve native to the estuaries and mudflats of China and Japan. It is extensively aquafarmed in China and other countries, with 742,084 tons worth US$667,876,000 harvested in 2008.

Clams from Duotou village in Putian city, Fujian are particularly famous, and are a key ingredient in Putian cuisine.

References

Pharidae
Bivalves described in 1818
Taxa named by Jean-Baptiste Lamarck